Two ships of the Royal Navy have been named HMS Hydrangea :

  an  sloop launched in 1916 and sold in 1920
 , a  launched in 1940 and sold in 1947. She became the mercantile Hydralock and was wrecked in 1957

Royal Navy ship names